Miroslava may refer to:
 Miroslava (actress), Mexican actress in the 1950s
 Miroslava (film), a 1993 film about the actress
 Miroslava of Bulgaria, a daughter of tsar Samuil of Bulgaria
 Miroslava, Iași, a commune in Iaşi County, Romania
 Miroslava (fly), a genus in family Scathophagidae

Given name
 Miroslava Němcová, Czech politician, former speaker of the Chamber of Deputies of the Parliament of the Czech Republic
 Mirka Federer, birth name Miroslava Vavrinec, wife and manager of Roger Federer
Miroslava Jánošíková (born 1969), Czech Olympic judoka
 Miroslava Jaškovská, Czech cross-country skier

See also
 Miroslav (disambiguation)
	

Russian feminine given names